Reading School is a grammar school for boys with academy status in the English town of Reading, the county of Berkshire. It traces its history back to the school of Reading Abbey and is, thus, one of the oldest schools in England. There are no tuition fees for day pupils, and boarders only pay for food and lodging. Reading is one of the best state schools in the UK according to the GCSE and A-level tables and has consistently ranked in the top ten.

History

Reading School was founded as part of Reading Abbey. The date of the Abbey's charter, 29 March 1125, is taken as the foundation date, making it the 10th oldest school in England, although there are hints that there may have been a school running in Reading before this.

In 1486, the school was refounded as a "Free Grammar School" ("free" here meaning teaching the free, or liberal, arts, not that no fees were paid) by Henry VII on the urging of the then Abbot, John Thorne. From at least this time, the School was housed in the former Hospitium of St John. The main building of the hospitium still exists, but the refectory, which once housed the schoolroom, was demolished in 1785 and Reading Town Hall now stands on the site.

After the dissolution of Reading Abbey in 1539, the school fell under the control of the corporation of Reading, its status being confirmed by Letters Patent issued by Henry VIII in 1541. This was reconfirmed in the Royal Charter granted to the corporation of Reading by Elizabeth I in 1560, which made the corporation liable for the salary of the headmaster and gave them the power of appointing him.

There were interruptions to schooling in 1665, when Parliament, forced out of London by the Great Plague, took over the schoolhouse. The civil war also interrupted, with the school being used as a garrison by royalist forces.

The school soon restarted, however, with the Reading School Act (1867) setting out its administration and funding. The foundation stone for new buildings, designed by Alfred Waterhouse (who also designed the Natural History Museum, London), was laid by the Prince of Wales Edward VII in 1870, and in 1871 the school moved in. In 1915 Kendrick Boys' School (founded in 1875 from the legacy of John Kendrick), which had a large endowment but poor facilities, was taken over by Reading, which was poorly funded but had excellent facilities – this caused considerable controversy at the time but was ultimately seen as successful.

The 1944 Education Act saw the abolition of fees (apart from boarding charges), with the cost of education now being met by the local authority. The 1960s saw the rise of comprehensive education in England and Wales, but Reading was exempted in 1973 (along with the girls' grammar school in Reading, Kendrick) after a petition of over 30,000 local people (a third of the voters of Reading) was handed to the government.

In 1986 the school celebrated the quincentenary of its refounding, and was graced by a visit by Queen Elizabeth II. A history of the school by Michael Naxton was published that year by Reading School Parents' Association.

On 6 July 2007 Reading School was officially designated as the landing site for the Thames Valley and Chiltern Air Ambulance when it needs to transport patients to the nearby Royal Berkshire Hospital. Previously, seriously injured or ill patients from the Reading area had to be flown either to Wexham Park Hospital near Slough, or to the John Radcliffe Hospital in Oxford for treatment. The new arrangement means that the school field can now be used for emergency touchdowns. Patients are transported by land ambulance from the school to the hospital's accident and emergency department across the road. While this arrangement was only made official in 2007, the school field had been unofficially used on several occasions by the Thames Valley and Chiltern Air Ambulance in previous years.

School site

, the Page building, the John Kendrick building, South House, Music School (formerly known as Junior School) and a chapel. The main school building, the chapel, South House and the building to the east of South House have all been designated as Grade II listed buildings by English Heritage.

The chapel is where the school's Christmas, Remembrance and Easter services take place, and every student attends once a week. The chapel has four groups of pews, facing towards the central aisle. Above the entrance is the organ, and at the far end is the altar and vestry.

Plans have been developed for improved sports and science facilities as part of the "1125 campaign". Work on improving science facilities began in 2015 and was completed in Spring 2017 as stated above. Work on the new sports facilities has begun, with a new fitness suite made on the location of the old squash courts next to chapel, and refurbishments on the gym and changing rooms completed.

Notable "Old Redingensians" (former students)

Deceased Old Redingensians (chronological order)

Living Old Redingensians (alphabetical order)

Notable headmasters

 1588–1589: Thomas Braddock
 1781–1830: Richard Valpy (1754–1836)
 1871–1877: Thomas Henry Stokoe

Inspections and awards
An OFSTED report concluded that "examination results place the school in the top five per cent nationally", "Pupils' attitudes to learning are outstanding" and "The school goes to exceptional lengths to broaden and enrich the education of all pupils". The 2005 Key Stage 3 results were both the best in the country for value-added and for the average points score of each student. In the 2004 school league tables for England (including fee-paying schools), it came eighth for GCSE-level results (average 602.5 points), 106th for A-level results (average 409.3 points) and 170th for value-added between ages 11 and 16 (score of 1037.7 compared with a baseline of 1000). It has recently become a DFES specialist school for the Humanities, specialising in English, Geography and Classics – the first school to specialise in Classics – despite entry being selected by Mathematics and verbal and non-verbal logic ability.

In 2005 the school was awarded the Sportsmark gold award for a four-year period. In the same year Reading was one of just 35 schools nationally to be made a Microsoft Partner School.

In 2007, the school was identified by the Sutton Trust as one of only 20 state schools among the 100 schools in the UK responsible for a third of admissions to Oxford and Cambridge Universities over the five preceding years. 16.0% of pupils went to Oxbridge and a 62.1% in total went to universities identified by the Sutton Trust as "top universities".
In July 2011, the school was further identified by the Sutton Trust as the third highest state school, and among the top 30 schools in the country, for proportion of higher education applicants accepted at Oxford and Cambridge Universities. The report found that 16.7% of pupils were accepted to Oxbridge and 81.5% were accepted to the highly selective Sutton Trust 30 universities over the previous three years.

Reading School was given the "State School of the Year" award by The Sunday Times newspaper in 2010 and 2019, in recognition of the school's academic achievements and community orientated ethos.

Subjects taught 

1. Latin is compulsory until Year 9, where the lower sets do Ancient History instead. Those who didn't choose to do Latin for GCSE can choose to do Ancient History instead, for the remainder of Year 9.

2. French, German, Spanish and Latin are compulsory in Year 7, while Mandarin can be chosen to replace a language except Latin. In Year 8 students must take 2 modern languages and Latin.

3. At least one ancient or modern language must be taken for the GCSEs.

4. Additional Maths is taken by some students at the same time as their GCSEs. Further Maths is optional at A Level, with some students being able to take it in one block with Maths.

5. The top half of the year take an externally-assessed AS-level Philosophy exam at the end of Year 10. Those who score a B or higher can either opt-out of the subject, continue onto the A2 or redo the exam the following year. Those who didn't score a B or higher can redo the exam the following year. The rest of the year will take an externally-assessed GCSE short course RS exam at the end of Year 11, though some exceptions can take the AS Philosophy exam instead.

6. In the sixth form, P.E. can optionally be taken as an examined A-Level. Those that do not do this must still take part in games weekly, though this is not examined or graded in any way, or must take part in Community Service during Games lessons. In Years 10 and 11, certain students are given the option of taking the GCSE as an additional subject. All other students must still complete Games lessons.

7. Not examined.

See also
 List of the oldest schools in the United Kingdom
 List of the oldest schools in the world
 Reading Abbey Girls' School
 List of English and Welsh endowed schools (19th century)

References

Further reading 
 Michael Naxton. The History of Reading School. Ringwood, Hampshire: Pardy Printers, 1986.
 John Oakes and Martin Parsons. Reading School: The First 800 Years. Peterborough: DSM, 2005. .
 John Oakes and Martin Parsons. Old School Ties: Educating for Empire and War. Peterborough: DSM, 2001. . (The stories of Old Redingsians in World War I.)
 A History of Cricket at Reading School, 1987.

External links
 Reading School
 Reading School Parents' Association
 Old Redingensians
 School overview and profile from Schoolsfinder

Grade II listed buildings in Reading
Grammar schools in Reading, Berkshire
Academies in Reading, Berkshire
Educational institutions established in the 12th century
1125 establishments in England
Boys' schools in Berkshire
Boarding schools in Berkshire
Alfred Waterhouse buildings
Grade II listed educational buildings
Schools with a royal charter